Puthen Pana is a Malayalam poem written by German Jesuit missionary priest Johann Ernst Hanxleden famously known as Arnos Pathiri in Kerala. The poem is believed to have been composed between 1721 and 1732. The poem deals with life of Jesus Christ. It is one of the better known and widely read poems in modern Indian literature.

Poem
The poem consists of 14 padams. The first padam has the poet telling readers that he is writing the poem at the request of Antonio Pimental, Archbishop of Cranganore, since Pimental held the ecclesiastical office from 1721 to 1752. The second padam tells Centre on Fall of Man, fourth padam (Annunciation), fifth padam (Nativity), seventh padam (Sermon on the Mount), tenth padam (Last Supper), eleventh padam (Trial and Crucifixion), 12th padam, portraying the lament of Virgin Mary at the Crucifixion and Death of Jesus, 13th (Resurrection) and 14th (Ascension). The 12th padam is considered the most important in the poem. But for the 12th 'padam' that is written in the metre, Nathonatha, the rest of the couplets are written in the metre, Sarpini. He also authored Chathuranthyam, Genevieva Punyacharithram and Ummaadaey Dhukhkham.
There is an ongoing effort to make the whole poem available online.

Puthen Pana Padams 10 to 14 can be viewed here.

Legacy
Puthenpana is one of the first Malayalam poems written on Christian themes in simple Malayalam. Even today  Kerala Christians recite this song on Holy Week, Lent, Maundy Thursday, Good Friday and Holy Saturday.

Bibliography
Joseph Palackal: Puthen pana, a musical study, New York, City of New York University, 1995.

See also
"Best Indian Poems"
Indian Poetry
Famous Poets of India

References

Malayalam-language poems
History of Thrissur
Indian poems
18th-century poems